Heinz Schneiter (12 April 1935 – 6 July 2017) was a Swiss football player and manager.

He got 44 caps and 3 goals for Switzerland, playing all three games at the 1962 World Cup as well as in Switzerland's 0–5 loss to West Germany at the 1966 World Cup. He scored against West Germany in the 1962 World Cup.

He coached FC Thun and BSC Young Boys.

References

External links

1935 births
2017 deaths
People from Thun
1962 FIFA World Cup players
1966 FIFA World Cup players
Swiss men's footballers
Switzerland international footballers
BSC Young Boys players
Swiss football managers
BSC Young Boys managers
FC Thun managers
Swiss-German people
Association football defenders
Sportspeople from the canton of Bern